Ofer Fabian is a former Israeli footballer who now works as the assistant manager of the Israel national under-21 football team.

Honours
 Toto Cup Artzit
 Winner (2): 1990, 1991

References

1962 births
Living people
Israeli footballers
Israel international footballers
Israeli football managers
Maccabi Petah Tikva F.C. players
Bnei Yehuda Tel Aviv F.C. players
Hapoel Petah Tikva F.C. players
Liga Leumit players
Maccabi Petah Tikva F.C. managers
Hapoel Marmorek F.C. managers
Footballers from Petah Tikva
Association football goalkeepers